Pseudopringsheimia is a genus of green algae, in the family Ulvellaceae.

References

Ulvales
Ulvophyceae genera